The Book of My Lives is the first book of nonfiction by the Bosnian-American novelist Aleksandar Hemon. It's a collection of nonfiction pieces about Hemon's childhood in Sarajevo and his adult life in Chicago. The final essay tells of his young daughter's brain tumor and untimely death; it was first published in The New Yorker under the title "The Aquarium."

Hemon’s The Book of My Lives was shortlisted for the National Book Critics Circle Award in 2013.

References

2013 non-fiction books
Books about refugees
Farrar, Straus and Giroux books